Markellos Sitarenios (born 14 May 1956) is a Greek former water polo player who competed in the 1980 Summer Olympics and in the 1984 Summer Olympics. He played at club level for Greek powerhouse Ethnikos Piraeus. He won 14 consecutive Greek championships and was the first Greek water polo player to play in the Italian league, where he played in 1985 with Polisportiva Anzio.

Titles

With Ethnikos Piraeus 
Greek championship (14): 1972, 1973, 1974, 1975, 1976, 1977, 1978, 1979, 1980, 1981, 1982, 1983, 1984, 1985

Greek cup (2): 1984, 1985

References
 

1956 births
Living people
Greek male water polo players
Olympic water polo players of Greece
Water polo players at the 1980 Summer Olympics
Water polo players at the 1984 Summer Olympics

Ethnikos Piraeus Water Polo Club players